Anton Huotari (21 January 1881, Nurmes – 7 November 1931) was a Finnish journalist and politician. He was a Member of the Parliament of Finland from 1908 to 1910 and again from 1911 to 1918, representing the Social Democratic Party of Finland (SDP). During the 1918 Finnish Civil War Huotari was a member of the Central Workers' Council of Finland. After the war he was in prison until 1922.

References

1881 births
1931 deaths
People from Nurmes
People from Kuopio Province (Grand Duchy of Finland)
Social Democratic Party of Finland politicians
Members of the Parliament of Finland (1908–09)
Members of the Parliament of Finland (1909–10)
Members of the Parliament of Finland (1911–13)
Members of the Parliament of Finland (1913–16)
Members of the Parliament of Finland (1916–17)
Members of the Parliament of Finland (1917–19)
People of the Finnish Civil War (Red side)
Prisoners and detainees of Finland
1931 suicides
Suicides by hanging in Finland